Mount Cooroora is located in the town of Pomona in the Sunshine Coast Region, Queensland, Australia.  The peak is a 439 metres high intrusive volcanic plug. The former Electoral district of Cooroora was named after the mountain.

Festival
Mount Cooroora plays host to the King of the Mountain festival. The main event at the festival is a footrace straight up the mountain drawing participants from all over the world.  Winners of the race complete the run to the summit in a little over 20 minutes.  The first run by a local footballer to the top of the mountain occurred in 1958. The Mountain Challenge race began in 1959 and has been run every year since.

Access
A maintained stoney path helps guide hikers to the mountain's peak, where good views of the surrounding area are available. The walk takes about two hours and is graded moderate to hard.  One section of the climb includes steep metal stairs fixed to rock.

See also

List of mountains of Australia

References

External links
Geology of the Sunshine Coast
Climbing Mount Cooroora

Mountains of South East Queensland
Geography of Sunshine Coast, Queensland